Notrees is an unincorporated community in west-central Ector County, Texas, United States. It is located on State Highway 302, about 20 miles northwest of Odessa. The community is part of the Odessa metropolitan statistical area.

The area began to develop in the 1940s following the discovery of large oil fields, including the TXL Field. Notrees was known at various times as Caprock and Strawberry. Local merchant Charles E. Brown petitioned for a post office and selected the descriptive name of Notrees. Reportedly, the community had a single native tree before it was destroyed during the construction of a Shell Oil Company "gas plant".

Notrees thrived during the 1950s and 1960s. In 1966, its population was 338 and the area was supported by several oil-company camps and a few businesses. The community began to decline by the 1980s as a result of oil companies abandoning the camps that once provided housing for employees and their families because of an improved infrastructure that enabled workers to live elsewhere (e.g., Odessa) and commute to Notrees.

The community's small population currently supports four businesses and a post office (zip code 79759).

The area has a 153 MW wind farm, connected to one of the world's largest grid energy storage systems that used a  lead-acid battery from 2012 to 2016, capable of delivering full effect for 40 minutes, and used mostly for frequency response. In 2017, it was replaced with lithium-ion batteries, and several larger batteries have been built.

See also

Nowood River, Wyoming

References

External links
Notrees, Texas – Texas Escapes Online Magazine

Other photos of the Llano Estacado and West Texas

Unincorporated communities in Texas
Unincorporated communities in Ector County, Texas